Thomas Cullinan (14 June 1946 – 24 January 2010) was a South African cricketer who played in four first-class matches for North Eastern Transvaal in the 1968/69 season.

References

External links
 

1946 births
2010 deaths
South African cricketers
Northerns cricketers
Place of birth missing